The Bone Doll's Twin is a fantasy novel by American writer Lynn Flewelling, the first in her  Tamir Triad.  It is followed by Hidden Warrior and then by Oracle's Queen.

Plot 
 
For three centuries a divine prophecy and a line of warrior queens protected Skala.  But the people grew complacent and  Erius, a usurper king, claimed his young half-sister's throne.  Now plague and drought stalk the land, war with Skala's ancient rival Plenimar drains the country's lifeblood, and to be born female into the royal line has become a death sentence as the king fights to ensure the succession of his only heir, a son.  For King Erius the greatest threat comes from his own line - and from Illior's faithful, who spread the Oracle's words to a doubting populace.  As noblewomen young and old perish mysteriously the kings nephew - his sister's only child - grows toward manhood.  But unbeknownst to the king or the boy, strange, haunted Tobin is the princess's daughter, given male form by dark magic to protect her until she can claim her rightful destiny.  Only Tobin's noble father, two wizards of Illior and an outlawed forest witch know the truth.  Only they can protect young Tobin from a king's wrath, a mother's madness, and the terrifying rage of her brother's demon spirit, determined to avenge his stolen life.

Reception
The book was generally acclaimed by readers and other authors.
George R. R. Martin wrote "The Bone Doll’s Twin is a thoroughly engrossing new fantasy. It got its hooks into me on the first page, and didn’t let loose until the last. I am already looking forward to the next installment.", while according to Robin Hobb the novel is "A relentless tale that examines whether the ends can ever completely justify the means."

References

2001 American novels
American fantasy novels
Voyager Books books
Novels with transgender themes